is a Japanese actress. She has appeared in more than forty films since 1996.

On October 10, 2019, she married actor Kei Hosogai. They divorced on February 23, 2023.

Selected filmography

Film

TV

Video games

References

External links
 

1979 births
Living people
People from Nagoya
Japanese film actresses
Japanese television actresses
Horikoshi High School alumni